Marie Louis Adolphe Guillaumat (4 January 1863 – 18 May 1940) was a French Army general during World War I.

Early years
Adolphe Guillaumat was born in Bourgneuf, Charente-Maritime.  He graduated first from his class of 1884 at the Saint-Cyr military academy.

Career
His early career was partly spent in the French Colonies (Algeria, Tunisia, Tonkin, China). He was appointed a sub-lieutenant of infantry in October 1884. Four years later he was promoted lieutenant. In November 1893 he became a captain and was transferred to the 147th infantry regiment. In 1903 he was appointed professor of military history at St. Cyr, and later became lecturer on infantry tactics at the École de Guerre. He was promoted lieutenant-colonel in 1907 and colonel in 1910.  In January 1913, he was appointed director of infantry, and obtained the rank of brigadier general in October of that year.

World War I

At the start of World War I, he was chief of Minister of War Adolphe Messimy's military cabinet. When the latter left office, Guillaumat was appointed as the head of the 33rd Infantry Division on 30 August 1914, and then of the 4th Infantry Division on 9 December 1914. He led the 1st Army Corps from 25 February 1915, and on 15 December 1916 he replaced Robert Nivelle as commander of the Second Army, when the latter was made commander-in-chief of the French Army.

Guillaumat was sent to replace General Sarrail as commander of the Allied Army of the Orient in Salonika in December 1917. He laid the plans later executed by his replacement, General Franchet d'Esperey, and rebuilt the relations with France's allies somewhat damaged by his predecessor. Guillaumat was recalled to Paris on 17 June 1918 and replaced with Franchet d'Esperey.

There, he replaced Auguste Dubail as military governor of Paris. After the success of the Second Battle of the Marne, he was appointed to the Supreme War Council. He then returned to active command as commander of the Fifth Army, which he led through the Ardennes at the end of the war.

Occupation of the Rhine
Following the Armistice, Guillaumat was appointed commander in chief of Allied occupation forces in the Rhineland. He was criticised for his failure to take suitable precaution against cold weather in the winter of 1928/1929 which led to some of the soldiers under his command freezing to death.

Political career

He was a  minister of war  in a short-lived (23 June – 19 July 1926) government led by  Aristide Briand, who had been one year his senior at the Nantes Lycée.

Personal life
Adolphe Guillaumat married Louise Bibent from Toulouse on 17 July 1906 and had two sons: Louis, who became an ophthalmologist, and Pierre, who became a civil servant and served as a minister of the armies of General De Gaulle after the latter's return to power from 1 June 1958 to 5 February 1960.

General Guillaumat was a practising Catholic and an admirer of Frédéric Bastiat.

Notes

Bibliography

External links

 Biographical note on Guillaumat 

1863 births
1940 deaths
People from Charente-Maritime
French military personnel of World War I
French generals
École Spéciale Militaire de Saint-Cyr alumni
Military governors of Paris
Grand Croix of the Légion d'honneur
French Ministers of War
Recipients of the Distinguished Service Medal (US Army)
French Roman Catholics